was a Japanese warlord (daimyō) of Ibaraki, in the Azuchi–Momoyama period through early Edo period. 
In his youth was famed as one of the Seven Spears of Shizugatake, during the Battle of Shizugatake in May 1583.

Biography
Katsumoto hailed from an ancient samurai clan with a long and distinguished history. In the early Heian period, Katagiri clan served the Minamoto family, traditional head of the samurai that supplied early shōguns and their government, and ruled the southernmost part of Shinano region for nearly 500 years.

Despite his lineage and the promising start at Battle of Shizugatake, Katsumoto's rise under Toyotomi Hideyoshi was relatively slow compared to his fellow "seven spears", which included Katō Kiyomasa and Fukushima Masanori. Katsumoto were more court samurai rather than warriors; Katsumoto was kept in the Osaka region, the de facto capital of Japan under the Toyotomi family, and his holdings were in Ibaraki area in the north. (Marked in present-day by a small bronze statue).

Followed Hideyoshi's death in 1598, Katsumoto was appointed the chamberlain of the Toyotomi household. After the Sekigahara campaign 1600, he was with Toyotomi Hideyori, the only son and heir of Hideyoshi, Katsumoto sought to negotiate a compromise between Ieyasu, Toyotomi clan lost most of his territory which were under management of 'western daimyō', and hideyori was degraded to an ordinary daimyō, not a ruler of Japan. 

However in 1614, Yodo-dono, mother of young Hideyori, who was hopelessly out of touch with the new and current Tokugawa ruler. Yodo-dono increasingly suspicious of Katsumoto's loyalty, and finally banished Katsumoto from Osaka castle which directly resulted in the Siege of Osaka (1614–1615) by Ieyasu's 200,000-strong army. The following summer 1615, the Toyotomi family was annihilated, Yodo-dono and Hideyori committed suicide within the burning castle.

Death
Katsumoto's precise role in all of this saga is unclear.  Katsumoto died only 20 days after the fall of the Osaka castle for unknown reasons, though the rumour of seppuku was rife. Although his own lineage died out later in the seventeenth century, Katsumoto's younger brother and his family maintained Katagiri's name and its standing as a daimyō. The descendants of which were ennobled in 1884 and retained the title of Viscounts until 1946 when the system was abolished.

Cultural references
Katsumoto's anguish after the fall of the Toyotomi clan was later dramatised in kabuki theatre where Katsumoto cut a tragic figure in Hamlet's mould.   In Tsubouchi Shōyō's play Kiri-hitoha, which describes the fall of the house of Toyotomi, Katsumoto, the main character, is a faithful servant with good intentions and keen sense of reality but rendered powerless caught in the whirlwind of dynastic struggle. At the climax of the play, Katsumoto famously deplores that the fate finally caught up with the house of Toyotomi. The play, which may well be the best modern kabuki piece written by arguably the best playwright of modern Japan (published 1894–95, first staged in 1904), made "Katagiri Katsumoto" a household name and remains one of the best and most popular modern kabuki plays.

References

片桐氏 from 1156 to 1868: Clan Katagiri and its history and as Daimyo family (in Japanese)

External links
Biographical information (in Japanese)

|-

1556 births
1615 deaths
Daimyo
Samurai
Toyotomi retainers
People from Ibaraki, Osaka